This is a list of electoral results for the electoral district of Haughton in Queensland state elections.

Members for Haughton

Election results

Elections in the 1950s

References

Queensland state electoral results by district